Ezequiel Jacinto de Biasi  (born 22 February 1993), simply known as Ezequiel, is a Brazilian professional footballer who plays as a right back for Londrina.

Ezequiel's younger brother Eduardo is also a footballer.

Honours
Cruzeiro
Copa do Brasil: 2017, 2018
Campeonato Mineiro: 2018

Chapecoense
Campeonato Catarinense: 2020
Campeonato Brasileiro Série B: 2020

References

External links
Cruzeiro profile 

1993 births
Living people
Sportspeople from Santa Catarina (state)
Brazilian footballers
Association football defenders
Campeonato Brasileiro Série A players
Campeonato Brasileiro Série B players
Criciúma Esporte Clube players
Oeste Futebol Clube players
Cruzeiro Esporte Clube players
Fluminense FC players
Esporte Clube Bahia players
Associação Chapecoense de Futebol players
Sport Club do Recife players
Liga Portugal 2 players
S.C. Braga B players
Brazilian expatriate footballers
Brazilian expatriate sportspeople in Portugal
Expatriate footballers in Portugal